The 2022 CBR Brave season was the Brave's 7th season in the Australian Ice Hockey League since being founded and entering the league in 2014. Canberra completed the double by finishing first in the regular season and winning the grand final in the AIHL Finals, lifting the H Newman Reid Trophy for the third time and Goodall Cup for the second time in franchise history.

Season notes

In February 2022, there was unconfirmed reports the CBR Brave were looking to leave the AIHL and join the newly formed Pacific Hockey League. In late February 2022, Brave CEO, Sunny Singh, publicly committed the team to the AIHL for the 2022 season. Singh said the AIHL had taken profound action in addressing key issues the Brave organisation had leading into the new season.

In April, the team announced the 2022 team roster, team staff and new on-ice leadership team. The Brave’s most capped player, Kai Miettinen, was appointed team captain, replacing the departed Matt Harvey. Bayley and Casey Kubara were promoted to alternate captains to assist Kai.

In July 2022, two regular season games involving the Brave and Melbourne Mustangs were first postponed and then cancelled due to flight cancellations. The Brave team were left stranded at Canberra Airport on Saturday morning and despite attempts to rebook were unable to secure a flight to Melbourne on the weekend of 2 and 3 July 2022. The Brave and Mustangs were subsequently unable to come to an agreement to re-arrange the two games before the end of the regular season and by early August the games were officially cancelled. Both teams were awarded three points each for the two cancelled games, sharing in the six points that would have been contested for.

On 31 July 2022, the CBR Brave announced the change in ownership of the team from Sunny Singh to Steve Moeller, with Moeller taking over the General Manager (GM) role within the organisation.

For the final three games of the regular season and the exhibition game against the Central Coast Rhinos, the Brave released gameday programmes for the first time since 2016. Unlike previously, the new programmes were released digitally only and not printed.

In 2022, the Brave setup two charity rounds during the AIHL regular season to raise money for Hockey Fights Cancer and Menslink. The team raised money during the games against the Newcastle Northstars and Sydney Ice Dogs and issued special one-off sweaters that were then auctioned off after the games.

The Brave set two new team records in 2022, securing the team's largest regular season and finals victories.

In regonition of the CBR Brave's acheivements in the 2022 season, the team was named Canberra team of the year in the 2022 CBR Sports Awards. The Brave were selected from a field of finalists including ACT Griffins, Canberra Gunners and Tuggeranong Vikings Masters Swimming Club. In additional to team of the year, the Brave were also ranked 20th in the top 25 Australasian Sporting Teams for 2022, produced by Platinum Asset Management and GAIN LINE Analytics.

Roster

Team roster for the 2022 AIHL season

Transfers

All transfers in and out of the team since the last AIHL season.

In

Out

Staff

Staff Roster for 2022 AIHL season

Standings

Regular season

Summary

Position by round

League table

Finals

Summary

Bracket

Schedule & results

Exhibition games

Regular season

Finals
Goodall Cup semi-final

Goodall Cup final

Player statistics
Stats for 2022 AIHL season

Skaters

Goaltenders

Awards

References

CBR Brave seasons